Rowe House may refer to:

in the United States (by state then city)
Rowe and Weed Houses, Granby, Connecticut, listed on the National Register of Historic Places (NRHP) in Hartford County
Belcher-Rowe House, Milton, Massachusetts, listed on the NRHP in Norfolk County
Rowe House (Milford, Michigan), listed on the NRHP in Oakland County
John Rowe House, Jasper, Minnesota, listed on the NRHP in Pipestone County
Miller-Rowe-Holgate House, Reno, Nevada, listed on the NRHP in Washoe County
Benjamin Rowe House, Gilford, New Hampshire, listed on the NRHP in Belknap County
Rowe Pueblo, Rowe, New Mexico, listed on the NRHP in San Miguel County
Rowe House (Wayland, New York), listed on the NRHP in Steuben County
Rowe House (Pierre, South Dakota), listed on the NRHP in Hughes County
Nicholas Rowe House, Park City, Utah, listed on the NRHP in Summit County
Rowe House (Fredericksburg, Virginia), listed on the NRHP in Fredericksburg